Charles Ashley Royal, known professionally as C. Ashley Royal, (born September 14, 1949) is a senior United States district judge of the United States District Court for the Middle District of Georgia.

Education and career

Born in Augusta, Georgia, Royal received an Artium Baccalaureus degree from the University of Georgia in 1971, a Juris Doctor from the University of Georgia School of Law in 1974, and a Master of Science degree from the University of Georgia in 1976. He was an assistant district attorney in the District Attorney's Office, Augusta Judicial Circuit, Georgia from 1974 to 1975. He was in private practice in Georgia in 1976, and was a public defender in Glynn County, Georgia, from 1976 to 1977, returning to private practice from 1977 to 2001.

District court service

On October 9, 2001, Royal was nominated by President George W. Bush to a seat on the United States District Court for the Middle District of Georgia vacated by Duross Fitzpatrick. Royal was confirmed by the United States Senate on December 20, 2001, and received his commission on December 21, 2001. He served as chief judge from 2009 to 2014. He assumed senior status on September 1, 2016.

References

Sources

1949 births
Living people
United States district court judges appointed by George W. Bush
21st-century American judges
Judges of the United States District Court for the Middle District of Georgia
Public defenders
University of Georgia alumni
University of Georgia School of Law alumni
People from Augusta, Georgia